Statistics of Austrian first league in season 1931–32.

Overview
It was contested by 12 teams, and SK Admira Wien won the championship.

League standings

Results

References
 Austria - List of final tables (RSSSF)

Austrian Football Bundesliga seasons
Austria
1931–32 in Austrian football